Safety in Numbers is the second studio album by American progressive electronic composer and percussionist David Van Tieghem, released in 1987 by Private Music. Van Tieghem and Roma Baran produced the album, and it was recorded at two separate recording studios in New York City, which were Battery Sound and Skyline Studios. Ryuichi Sakamoto of Yellow Magic Orchestra recorded his overdubs at Avic Studio in Tokyo. The sounds and sequences were digitally transferred to floppy disks and sent to Skyline Studio in New York, where they were realized onto multitrack tape by David Lebolt via Macintosh computer, MIDI interface and Mark of the Unicorn Performer software.

Tony Levin, the longtime bassist for progressive rock band King Crimson, plays Chapman Stick on the track "Night of the Cold Noses". Safety in Numbers music has been described as a "downtown" mix of pop, new-age, percussion music and electronic music. The album makes extensive use of the Fairlight CMI digital sampling synthesizer.

After its original release, the album remained out-of-print on any format for many years. However, the album became available in 2017 via online MP3 download on Bandcamp.

Critical reception

In a retrospective review for AllMusic, critic "Blue" Gene Tyranny (who also played piano on "Crystals" from the album) wrote, "not comfortably labeled New Age, or percussion music, or pop, or electronic music, Van Tieghem's music has that "downtown" mix of all these and yet is distinctly his own...from the lush "Crystals" to the droll and rhythm steady "Night of the Cold Noses." This is twisted "easy listening."

Track listing

Personnel
Credits are adapted from the Safety in Numbers liner notes.Musicians David Van Tieghem – drums; percussion (metal ashtray; plastic milk bottle; Suzuki musical spring; scrap metal; Japanese stones; plastic mailing tube; aluminum soda cans; corrugated plastic hose; lamp parts; plastic sticks; bowed Chinese cymbal; Chinese gong; Roland Octapad); sampling (Fairlight CMI IIx and Series III; Akai S900); synthesizers (Yamaha DX7 and DX100; Korg Poly-800; Roland Juno-60; Voyetra-8); marimba; piano; clavinet; wooden tongue drum; ceramic drums; bells; jingle ball toy; raygun; processed radio and television signals; drum machine (E-mu SP-1200); voice
 Bill Buchen – African water drums; parabolic gamelan; wooden tongue drum 
 David Lebolt – synthesizers (Yamaha DX7; TX7; Voyetra Eight; memory Moog); sampling (Emulator II) 
 Ryuichi Sakamoto – synthesizer (Yamaha DX7); sampling (Emulator II; Fairlight CMI IIx) 
 Robbie Kilgore – additional synthesizer programming
 Larry Saltzman – guitar 
 Eric Liljestrand – guitar; EBow; programming assistance 
 Laura Demme – voice 
 Rebecca Armstrong – voice 
 Sara Cutler – harp 
 "Blue" Gene Tyranny – piano 
 Tony Levin – Chapman Stick 
 Ned Sublette – pedal steel guitar 
 Richard Landry – flute 
 Richard J. Van Tieghem – shortwave radio 
 Tatsuhiko Mori – computers
 Clive Smith – programming assistanceTechnical David Van Tieghem – producer
 Roma Baran – producer
 Leanne Ungar – engineer; mixing
 Eric Liljestrand – engineer
 Knut Bohn – assistant engineer
 Derek Davis – assistant engineer
 Barbara de Mauro – assistant engineer
 Bob Ludwig – mastering engineerArtwork'
 Jo Bonney – cover design
 Laura Demme – design
 Bill Buchen – design
 Deborah Feingold – portrait photo
 Paula Court – graphics photography
 Howard Sochurek – front cover color image processing

References

External links

1987 albums
David Van Tieghem albums
Private Music albums